Martin D. Burke (born February 5, 1976, in Westminster, Maryland) is the May and Ving Lee Professor for Chemical Innovation at the University of Illinois at Urbana–Champaign, and Associate Dean of Research in the Carle Illinois College of Medicine. His research has involved the development of antifungal treatments for cystic fibrosis, and the development of a COVID-19 test that the University of Illinois has used over one million times.

Early life and education
Burke was born on February 5, 1976, in Westminster, Maryland. Burke studied chemistry as an undergraduate at Johns Hopkins University, graduating in 1998 with his B.A. in Chemistry. While an undergraduate, he was a Howard Hughes Medical Institute Undergraduate Research Fellow, and he conducted research with Professors Henry Brem and Gary H. Posner on derivatives of calcitriol as potential drug candidates. Burke went on to Harvard University, where he earned a Ph.D. and M.D. in 2003 and 2005, respectively. Burke conducted his Ph.D. thesis work with Professor Stuart L. Schreiber on the combinatorial synthesis of small molecules with diverse skeletons.

Independent career 
He joined the Department of Chemistry in 2005 as an Assistant Professor, was promoted to Associate Professor in 2011, then to full Professor in 2014. He was appointed Associate Dean of Research of the Carle-Illinois College of Medicine in 2018. In response to the COVID-19 Pandemic, Burke was appointed to lead the University of Illinois' SHIELD initiative to protect the community with testing. A collaborative effort between Burke and Paul J. Hergenrother lead to the development of a saliva test called covidSHIELD for COVID-19 that has been used over 1 million times in the campus community.

CovidSHIELD Emergency Use Authorization Controversy
On August 19, 2020, Burke spoke at a press conference held by Illinois Governor J.B. Pritzker declaring that the covidSHIELD saliva test had been administered under an umbrella FDA emergency use authorization. Reporters at Illinois Newsroom broke that an FDA spokesperson commented that the test was indeed not Emergency Use Authorized, only a similar test developed at Yale had been authorized. Burke as well as others maintained that a "bridging study" allowed the test to be Emergency Use Authorized as it was deemed "non-inferior" to the Yale test. Nevertheless, the University of Illinois Press Release was amended to no longer claim Emergency Use Authorization in September 2020 without any notice that edits had been made. On January 14, 2022, the FDA did grant covidSHIELD Emergency Use Authorization under the EUA Number EUA202555.

Research 
Burke's research is divided into three segments, "Lego Chemistry", Molecular Prosthetics, and Antifungals.  "Lego chemistry" involves the use of "boron-protected haloboronic acids" to iteratively cross-couple building blocks into complex molecules. This work culminated into a paper in the journal Science. Work in this area is ongoing and has begun to include a focus on Csp3 cross-coupling to expand the value of the automated process. Molecular prosthetics is the study of small organic molecules that restore function of aberrant or missing proteins in biology. Burke has reported on two molecular prosthetics in detail including Hinokitiol and Amphotericin B. Hitokitiol restores iron transport as well as other metals, acting as a prosthetic for passive metal transporters as reported in Science. Amphotericin B assembles into small pores to allow bicarbonate across endothelial cells which shows promise in treatment of cystic fibrosis  Amphotericin B is also involved in the antifungal finger of the Burke's research. His group discovered that the analog "C2’deOAmB" is able to kill fungal cells by binding ergosterol but not cholesterol.

Recognition
Burke was named a Beckman Foundation Young Investigator in 2008. In 2013 the American Chemical Society gave him their Elias J. Corey Award for Outstanding Original Contribution in Organic Synthesis by a Young Investigator, and in 2017 they named Burke their Nobel Laureate Signature Award in Graduate Education in Chemistry.

References

External links
Home page

University of Illinois Urbana-Champaign faculty
21st-century American chemists
Living people
Johns Hopkins University alumni
Harvard Medical School alumni
1976 births